Major Sir Hew Fleetwood Hamilton-Dalrymple, 10th Baronet,  (9 April 1926 – 26 December 2018) was a British soldier and Lord Lieutenant of East Lothian.

Career
Hamilton-Dalrymple was educated at Ampleforth College and joined the Grenadier Guards in 1944 at the age of 18. His last post was Adjutant of the Grenadier Guards before he retired from the army in 1962, with the rank of major. Subsequently he was Adjutant, later president of the Council, and finally Captain-General of the Royal Company of Archers (the Queen's ceremonial bodyguard for Scotland) and Gold Stick for Scotland 1996–2004. He was Lord Lieutenant of East Lothian 1987–2001.

Hamilton-Dalrymple was a landowner whose property included the Bass Rock island bird sanctuary (off East Lothian) which has been in his family since 1706. He was vice-chairman of Scottish and Newcastle Breweries 1983–86 and chairman of Scottish American Investment Company 1985–91.

Marriage and family
In 1954, he married Lady Anne-Louise Mary Keppel (1932–2017), daughter of the 9th Earl of Albemarle. They had four sons, including the writer, historian, critic and broadcaster William Dalrymple, and the cricketer John Dalrymple.

References

Sources
DALRYMPLE, Sir Hew (Fleetwood) Hamilton-, Who's Who 2014, A & C Black, 2014; online edn, Oxford University Press, December 2013

External links

1926 births
2018 deaths
People educated at Ampleforth College
Baronets in the Baronetage of Nova Scotia
Grenadier Guards officers
Members of the Royal Company of Archers
Lord-Lieutenants of East Lothian
Knights Grand Cross of the Royal Victorian Order
Scottish justices of the peace
British Army personnel of World War II